Clevelandia may refer to:

 Clevelândia, a municipality in Brazil
 Clevelândia do Norte, a village in Amapá, Brazil
 Clevelandia beldingii, a plant in the broomrape family Orobanchaceae
 Clevelandia ios, a fish in the family Gobiidae